List of aerial victories of Wilhelm Frankl

Background
Wilhelm Frankl (1893-1917) was a German First World War fighter ace credited with 20 confirmed aerial victories. He scored his first aerial victory with a carbine on 10 May 1915, before the Fokker Eindecker, the world's first dedicated fighter airplane, came into use. Once Frankl was equipped with an Eindecker, he became part of Germany's air superiority offensive, the Fokker Scourge, shooting down eight more enemy airplanes. He became one of the first eight aces in Germany's service, and one of its first winners of the prestigious Pour le Merite. As such, he was appointed to lead one of the world's first fighter squadrons, Jagdstaffel 4. Although he died fighting for Germany on 8 April 1917, in later years the Nazis would ignore his wartime conversion to Christianity, and expunge his heroic record because he was Jewish.

The victory list
Wilhelm Frankl's victories are reported in chronological order, which is not necessarily the order or dates the victories were confirmed by headquarters.
Background information from Above the Lines and The Aerodrome website. Supplemental information cited in individual victories and claims. Abbreviations were expanded by the editor creating this list.

Citations

Sources  

 Franks, Norman. Sharks Among Minnows: Germany's First Fighter Pilots and the Fokker Eindecker Period, July 1915 to September 1916 (2001). London UK, Grub Street Publishing.  
 
 

Aerial victories of Frankl
Lists of World War I aerial victories